Lansley is a surname. Notable people with the surname include:

 Alastair Lansley (born 1947), British architect
 Andrew Lansley (born 1956), British politician
 Diane Lansley (born 1953), English swimmer
 Jacky Lansley (born 20th century), British choreographer
 Oliver Lansley (born 1981), British actor and writer